Roxey Ann Caplin (1793 – 2 August 1888) was a British writer and inventor.

Biography
She was born in 1793 in Canada. Around 1835, she married Jean Francois Isidore Caplin (c.1790-c.1872).

From 1839, Caplin was a corsetmaker working at 58 Berners Street, London.

At the Great Exhibition in 1851, she was awarded the prize medal of "Manufacturer, Designer and Inventor" for her corsetry designs. The corsets from the Great Exhibition in 1851 are in the Museum of London.

In 1860, she became a member of the Royal Society for the Encouragement of Arts, Manufactures & Commerce (RSA). By 1864, she had filed 24 patents.

She died on 2 August 1888 at Cambridge Lodge, St Leonard's East Sheen in Surrey. Her effects were valued at £6452, a considerable estate for a tradesman in this period.

Madame Caplin
How shall the poet, in a single lay,
the glory of her age and time portray?
Suffice if for the wondering world to mark
She took from all beside the medal in Hyde Park;
The only prize that was for corsets given
to any manufacturer under heaven.
Lo! the dazzling splendours of her fame advance
O'er 'All England' and the whole of France
She, the beloved, who now fills Brunswick's throne
Deals with Madame Caplin – her alone;
Why need I paint the heroine of my lays,
Or tell the land where passed her virgin days;
'Twas Canada!'-above all colonies renowned—
that heard my heroine's praises first resound,
You'll an incarnation of the graces meet
at No. 58 in Berners Street.
Science and pure benevolence combined,
A deity in human form enshrined;
Gracious demeanour, and courtly mien,
Learning and worth are thine, great Native queen.

Selected works
 Health and Beauty: or, Woman and Her Clothing, Considered in Relation to the Physiological Laws of the Human Body (1850);
 Health and Beauty – 1854 version.
 Health and Beauty – 1856 version
 Health and Beauty – 1864 version.
 Woman and Her Wants; Four Lectures To Ladies (1860);
 Women in the Reign of the Queen Victoria (1876) with J. Mill.

References

Sources
 
 Kelly's London Postal Directory, London, 1859–62; Times, London, 4 August 1888, p. 1.
 Health and Beauty 1856
 Health and Beauty 1864
 Dummy for Stays; designs, no. 669 year 1841
 The Hygean or Corporifom Corset; usefuld designs, no. 1995 year 1849
 S. Levitt, Victorians unbuttoned: registered designs for clothing, their makers and wearers, 1839–1900 (1986), 26–30
 R. A. Caplin, Health and beauty, or, Corsets and clothing (1856)
 R. A. Caplin, The needle: its history and utility (1860)
 R. A. Caplin and J. Mill, Women in the reign of Queen Victoria [1876]
 J. F. I. Caplin, Selection of documents and autograph letters in testimony of the cures effected by the electro-chemical bath of J. F. I. Caplin (1865)
 J. F. I. Caplin, 'Prospectus of the Manchester Hygiaenic Gymnasium', Catalogue of the works exhibited in the British section of the exhibition ... together with exhibitors' prospectuses, 10 (1856)
 J. T. S. Lidstone, The Londoniad: a grand national poem on the arts (1856)
 registered design, 1841, TNA: PRO, BT 42, no. 669 
 registered design, 1849, TNA: PRO, BT 45, no. 1995
 PO street directories, London, Mortlake, and Manchester
 census returns for Mortlake, 1881
 d. cert. Likenesses  C. Silvy, photograph, c.1864, reproduced in Caplin, Selection of documents · photogravure photograph, c.1875, reproduced in Caplin and Mill, Women in the reign of Queen Victoria Wealth at death  £6452 19s. 10d.: probate, 5 September 1888, CGPLA England & Wales

External links

 from Godey's Lady's Book in March 1854
 
 The Correspondence of James McNeill Whistler
 RSA, Female Membership 1754–1954
 Ingenious Women

Women of the Victorian era
English inventors
19th-century English women writers
19th-century English writers
19th-century British writers
1793 births
1888 deaths
English feminists
Corsetry
Women inventors
19th-century English businesspeople
19th-century English businesswomen